(Dai Chushingura) is a Japanese television dramatization of the events of the Forty-seven Ronin. The first episode aired on January 5, 1971, and the 52nd and final episode appeared on December 28 of the same year. The NET network broadcast it in the Tuesday evening 9:00–9:56 prime-time slot in Japan.

The series featured an all-star cast. The central actor was Toshiro Mifune, who portrayed Ōishi Kuranosuke; Yoko Tsukasa his wife; and kabuki actor Onoe Kikugorō VII their son Chikara.

Ichikawa Chūsha VIII took the part of Kira Yoshinaka, but died after the filming of Episode 47; his brother Kodayū replaced him. 

Many actors appeared as guest stars in only a few episodes. Among them were many known to audiences outside Japan. These included superstar Kinnosuke Nakamura as Wakisaka Awaji-no-kami, Matsumoto Kōshirō, Shintaro Katsu (of Zatoichi fame), Mifune's frequent co-star Takashi Shimura, Eiji Okada, Yukiyo Toake, Kinichi Hagimoto, Terumi Niki, Masaaki Sakai, and Shinji Maki.

The series has been rerun during the more than 35 years that have passed since it was first aired. It is available in several DVD sets.

Cast
Toshiro Mifune as Ōishi Yoshio
Tetsuya Watari as Horibe Yasubei
Yoko Tsukasa as Ōishi Riku
Go Wakabayashi as Maebara Isuke
Shinjirō Ehara as Kataoka Gengoemon
Yūnosuke Itō as Ōno Kurobei
Masakazu Tamura as Yato Emohichi
Takahiro Tamura as Takadaya Gunbei
Tetsuro Tamba as Chisaka Takafusa
Shigeru Tsuyuguchi as Usuke
Ichiro Arishima
 Etsushi Takahashi as Mori Koheita
Kōji Ishizaka as Kayano Sanppie
Yoko Yamamoto as Okei
Kunio Murai
Takeo Chii as Minagawa Shoroku
Yoshiko Sakuma
Miyoko Akaza
Ryosuke Kagawa as Hara Sōemon
Kenji Imai as Saitō Seizaemon
Nobuo Kawai as Endō Sanzaemon
Tamao Nakamura as Aiba Shino
Frankie Sakai as Akabane Genzo
Yoshi Kato as Yato Chosuke
Yoshio Tsuchiya as Tsuchiya Shuzen
Yoshio Inaba
Katsumasa Uchida as Gojō Ryuta
Isao Yamagata
Shigeru Kōyama as Yanagisawa Yoshiyasu
Akiji Kobayashi as Terasaka Kichiemon
Katsuo Nakamura as Okano Kingoemon
Shinsuke Ashida as Kobayashi Haihachi
Shigeru Amachi as Shimizu Ichigaku
Junzaburo Ban as Onodera Junai
Jun Tazaki
Hideo Takamatsu as Rinzo Kakui
Toru Abe
Takashi Shimura as Horiuchi Denbeiemon
Akihiko Hirata as Horiuchi Gentaemon
Shintaro Katsu as Tawaraboshi Genba

References

External links
"Dai Chûshingura" at IMDB
時代劇アワー:大忠臣蔵 Jidaigeki Hour: Daichūshingura at TV-Tokyo
Jidaigeki Channel
DVD announcement (includes English)

1971 Japanese television series debuts
1971 Japanese television series endings
Jidaigeki television series
TV Asahi original programming
Works by Ichirô Ikeda
Television series set in the 17th century